Lewis Woodson (January 1806 – January 1878) was an educator, minister, writer, and abolitionist. He was an early leader in the African Methodist Episcopal Church (AME) in Ohio and Pennsylvania. Woodson started and helped to build other institutions within the free African-American communities in Ohio and western Pennsylvania prior to the American Civil War.

Woodson was among the original 24 trustees to found Wilberforce University in Ohio in 1856, in a collaboration between the AME and the Cincinnati Methodist Council. When the college faced financial difficulties during the American Civil War, the AME Church bought it from the Methodist Church in 1863, making it the first historically black college to be owned and operated by African Americans.

Birth and early life
Lewis Woodson was the oldest of eleven children born to Thomas and Jemima Woodson, both mixed-race slaves who had gained their freedom. He was born in January 1806 in Greenbrier County, Virginia (now part of West Virginia).

Woodson family oral history, dating to the early nineteenth century, has claimed that Thomas Woodson was the eldest child of Sally Hemings and her master President Thomas Jefferson. That account has been disputed by Jeffersonian historians. Birth certificates were not common until 100 years after Thomas Woodson was born and they were never issued for the birth of slave children. There is no surviving record of Sally Hemings' having given birth to a surviving child before 1795. Professional historians have ignored the erasure of a name of a male slave born in 1790, written into Jefferson's Farm Book by Thomas Jefferson. One letter of the name of the mother of the child survived the erasure. Historians also ignore the newspaper articles of James Callender and others in 1802 and/or the content of articles that are acknowledged. Thomas Woodson was not named Thomas Woodson at birth. Slaves usually did not have a surname.

In addition, results of a 1998 Jefferson DNA study conclusively showed that there was no genetic link between the Jefferson male line and the Woodson male line.  The study's major findings were that the Y chromosome of the Jefferson male line matched that of Sally Hemings' son Eston's descendant. The Woodson Y chromosome did show northern European ancestry. The body of the 3rd President, Thomas Jefferson, was not exhumed, thus his DNA (sample) was not tested.

Move to Ohio and later to Pittsburgh
The Woodson family moved from Virginia to Chillicothe, Ohio about 1821. Chillicothe had a strong community of numerous free blacks, a center of abolitionist activity, and a station on the Underground Railroad. Soon the Woodsons helped establish a black Methodist Episcopal congregation there, the first west of the Allegheny Mountains.

Lewis and two brothers, Thomas and John, became ministers in the African Methodist Episcopal Church (AME), a new, independent, African-American denomination started in Philadelphia in 1816. The Woodsons helped establish new congregations in what was then thought of as the western United States. Lewis Woodson moved with his family to Pittsburgh, PA in 1830/1.

Marriage and family
In Chillicothe, Lewis Woodson married Caroline Robinson, also born in Virginia. The Woodsons had ten surviving children, many of whom followed their models in gaining education and contributing to their communities. One of the ten Woodson children married a member of the Tanner family and another married a member of the Highgate family, who had lived in Pennsylvania since well before the American Revolution as free black Americans.

A son of Lewis and Carline Woodson, Granville S. Woodson served on the Executive Committee of the National Equal Rights League.   Their grandson George Frederick Woodson earned degrees from Drew University and Morris Brown University. He served as Dean of the Payne Theological Seminary at Wilberforce for over three decades, ending in 1937. Their grandson Howard D. Woodson earned a degree in civil engineering from what is now the University of Pittsburgh in 1899. He contributed to the design of Union Station in Washington, D.C. and also became a civic activist. H.D. Woodson High School is named in his honor.

Greenwood-Praeger published a highly acclaimed non-fiction best seller in 2001, written by a great-great grandson of Lewis and Carline Woodson. C- Span aired this video of one of the author's presentations. The book covered Woodson family genealogy and history. 
https://www.c-span.org/video/?165070-1/a-president-family

A great-great-great grandson of Lewis and Carline Woodson, Timothy K. Lewis, became a United States District Judge in Pittsburgh in 1991 and became a United States Circuit Judge in 1992.

AME conferences 
In 1829 Woodson began an active life of writing to influence public policy, with a letter published by Freedom's Journal, an early African-American newspaper. He denounced proposals for expatriation or colonization of black Americans to Africa, as supported by the American Colonization Society. He advocated separate black communities in the United States.

Reverend Lewis Woodson served as secretary for an AME Conference in Hillsborough, Ohio (near Cincinnati) while Bishop Morris Brown presided. The riots of 1829 in Cincinnati had driven out much of the African-American population. Labor competition had led to whites' attacking blacks, who had been establishing a thriving free black community. Nearly 1200 blacks left Cincinnati for Canada as a result.

In Pittsburgh, Woodson joined with John B. Vashon to establish the African Education Society. One of the students in Woodson's school was George Vashon, who was taught by Woodson until black students were allowed to attend publicly financed schools. George Vashon was the first African American to graduate from Oberlin College. Oberlin graduated 23 blacks before the Civil War, making a significant contribution to the uplift of the Antebellum African American community. Martin Delany was also one of Woodson's students. Woodsn's one teacher school was one of the first to be operated by an African American. As Secretary to the AME Ohio Conference of 1833, Woodson advanced a resolution urging the AME to establish or assist "...common schools, Sunday Schools and temperance societies..." It was the first such resolution to urge the AME denomination to support education. Lewis Woodson filled a key role in the establishment of the Third, or Ohio District, of the AME denomination. The AME Church founded Union Seminary near Columbus, Ohio in 1847.

A few years after arriving in Pittsburgh, Lewis Woodson opened a barbershop. He operated the business at the same time he pursued his ministry and major civic interests. Vashon and Woodson befriended the young Martin Delany, and acted as his teachers and mentors. Delany became a spokesman for blacks during the Civil War and helped them to be accepted as soldiers on the Union side.

In 1837 Lewis Woodson served as secretary for a group of African Americans who created the "Pittsburgh Memorial", a document asserting that free blacks should retain the voting right in Pennsylvania. Following the 1831 Nat Turner slave rebellion in Virginia and the growth of the free population in Pennsylvania, fears contributed to support among whites to restrict the rights of free blacks.  While the legislature deprived free blacks of the right to vote in the Commonwealth for some years, Woodson was instrumental in securing public funding for black education. He joined the Western District of the Pennsylvania Anti-Slavery Society and worked for abolition.

"Augustine" and the father of Black nationalism
The historian Floyd Miller documented that Woodson wrote under the pen name "Augustine" (the name of an early Christian bishop and theologian from north Africa, who is honored as a saint in the Catholic Church). Miller suggested that in this role, Woodson could be called the "Father of Black Nationalism".  From 1837 to 1841, Woodson published numerous letters as "Augustine" in The Colored American (New York City) newspaper. He advocated black initiatives to create institutions independent of whites, including churches, newspapers, and schools. Woodson advocated preparing for when the multitudes of American slaves would gain freedom, and require social, organizational, and financial assistance.

Woodson attended and organized national and state conventions of black American abolitionists. He attended at least one national convention and spoke there. He helped to organize and lead conventions targeted toward Pennsylvania. One such convention took place in Pittsburgh in August 1841. John B. Vashon and Rev. Samuel Williams also served on the organizing committee for that convention. Woodson also served as one of the secretaries for that convention. He attended conventions where black and white abolitionists gathered, including one in Cincinnati in 1850.

Lewis Woodson engaged in debates and ideological clashes with other black American leaders. Woodson joined the American Moral Reform Society (AMRS), but his contribution was that of dissent. AMRS leader William Whipper vehemently opposed the naming of and constitution of organizations and churches on the basis of color and race. Whipper, for instance, did not approve of the African Methodist Episcopal Church, the church to which Reverend Woodson was attached. The letters Woodson wrote to the Colored American newspaper were, in part, meant to oppose Whipper's views. Woodson clashed with Frederick Douglass because of Woodson's opposition to Garrisonism. Douglass sent a scathing letter to The Anti-Slavery Bugle wherein Douglass likened Woodson to "Judas Iscariot."  The letter was written before Douglass' split with William Lloyd Garrison was complete. Said another way, after the Douglass/Woodson clash, Douglass' stance came closer to Woodson's (not directly as result of the clash).

David Walker's Appeal is a maze of sometimes conflicting ideological statements. Douglass not only started his own newspaper, but changed his stance and split away for Garrison's ideology. Delany promoted the emigration of black Americans, but did not himself emigrate. Part of Woodson's mark is that he was unwavering; the ideological stances he adopted over 40 years of activism did not change. Woodson never called for a slave uprising, he never supported black American emigration to Africa, and he never supported Garrisonism. It would be a stretch, of course, to claim that the black American ethnicity followed, directly, Woodson, even though his stance and the stance of the majority of black Americans was, over time, consistent. Yet, there is something to that correlation, which can not be easily be captured and stated with assurance.

Establishing Wilberforce University 
Along with Bishop Daniel Payne, Woodson was among the four black Americans representing the AME Church; when the 24-member founding Board of Trustees of Wilberforce College first convened in Ohio. They created a collaborative venture with white representatives of the Cincinnati Conference of the Methodist Episcopal Church, which provided the first major funding. The university was opened in 1856 to provide collegiate education to African Americans. Among the trustees was Salmon P. Chase, a strong supporter of abolition and then Governor of Ohio.<ref>[http://docsouth.unc.edu/church/talbert/talbert.html#p263 Horace Talbert, The Sons of Allen: Together with a Sketch of the Rise and Progress of Wilberforce University, Wilberforce, Ohio'], 1906, p.264-265, Documenting the American South, 2000, University of North Carolina, accessed 25 Jul 2008</ref>  The AME representatives were the first African Americans to participate in establishing a historically black college. (The first college for black students, now Lincoln University, was established by Presbyterians, who were aligned with the goals of the American Colonization Society, in Pennsylvania in 1854. No African Americans participated in its founding.)

In 1858 Woodson's youngest sister, Sarah Jane Woodson, a graduate of Oberlin College in Ohio, was hired as the first woman to teach at Wilberforce. She became the first African-American woman to teach at any college.

The outbreak of the American Civil War cut off paying students from the South, who had comprised a majority of the 200 students at Wilberforce. Most were mixed race; their tuition was paid by their wealthy white planter fathers. The war also diverted Methodist Church resources, and it was unable to fully fund the school. In 1862 the Board of Trustees temporarily closed Wilberforce University because of financial problems.

In 1863 the AME Church purchased the university and assumed full responsibility for it. They selected Bishop Daniel Payne as president, the first African-American college president in the United States. To help raise money for the purchase, the AME Church sold the property used by Union Seminary to put its resources into Wilberforce University.

Death, legacy and honors
Lewis Woodson died in January 1878. He was buried in the Allegheny Cemetery in Pittsburgh, PA. Caroline Woodson, who died after her husband, is buried next to him. The Pittsburgh Dispatch newspaper printed an obituary for Caroline "Slave" Woodson in 1892. To the contrary, Caroline was the daughter of Joe Robinson, a free man of color, who was enumerated in the 1810 U S census for Virginia and the 1830 U S census for Ross County, Ohio as such.  

One of his obituaries reported his work on the Underground Railroad. Wilberforce University has a strong tradition of teaching the history of its establishment, including the contributions of Lewis Woodson and Daniel A. Payne. The John Heinz History Center in Pittsburgh has, since its inception, included the contributions of John B. Vashon, Lewis Woodson and Martin Delany in its exhibition.

References

 Further reading 
Floyd Miller, The Search for Black Nationality, (Univ. of Illinois Press, 1975)
Benjamin Quarles, Black Abolitionists, (New York: Oxford Univ. Press, 1969) - use index
C. Peter Ripley, ed., The Black Abolitionist Papers: The United States, 1830–1846, (Univ. North Carolina Press, 1991)
Eric Ledell Smith, "The Pittsburgh Memorial", Pittsburgh History, vol. 80, no. 3, Fall 1997)
Byron W. Woodson Sr., A President in the Family'', New York: Praeger, 2001

1806 births
1878 deaths
African-American academics
African-American writers
African Methodist Episcopal Church clergy
Wilberforce University
People from Chillicothe, Ohio
People from Greenbrier County, West Virginia
African-American history of West Virginia
Underground Railroad people
19th-century American writers
19th-century Methodist ministers
Burials at Allegheny Cemetery
19th-century American clergy